Stuart A. Kirk holds the Marjorie Crump Chair in Social Welfare at UCLA and is a former psychiatric social worker. His research interests include mental health issues, particularly the creation and use of the Diagnostic and Statistical Manual of Mental Disorders (DSM). Kirk has authored, co-authored and edited many books, including most recently Mad Science: Psychiatric Coercion, Diagnosis, and Drugs (2013). He was former chief editor of the Social Work Research journal.

Education
B.A., Sociology, University of California, Berkeley;
M.S.W., University of Illinois, Champaign-Urbana;
D.S.W. in Social Welfare, University of California, Berkeley

Books
Kirk, S.A. and H. Kutchins. The Selling of DSM: The Rhetoric of Science in Psychiatry. Hawthorne, NY: Aldine de Gruyter, 1992.
Kutchins, H. & S.A. Kirk. Making Us Crazy: DSM--the Psychiatric Bible and the Creation of Mental Disorder. NY: Free Press, 1997.
Kirk, S.A., (Ed.), Social Work Research Methods: Building Knowledge for Practice. Washington, D.C.:NASW Press, 1999.
Kirk, S.A. & Reid, W.J. Science and Social Work: A Critical Appraisal. New York: Columbia University Press, 2002.
Kirk, S.A.,(Ed.), Mental Disorders in The Social Environment, NY: Columbia University Press, 2005.

References

American social workers
Living people
Diagnostic and Statistical Manual of Mental Disorders
UCLA Luskin School of Public Affairs faculty
UC Berkeley School of Social Welfare alumni
University of Illinois School of Social Work alumni
Social work scholars
Year of birth missing (living people)